The North Africa medal was a French commemorative medal established on 29 April 1997 by French President Jacques Chirac via decree 97-424, following an initiative of Pierre Pasquini, Minister for veterans' affairs and victims of war who expressed "the importance that an exceptional decoration be established for those who had fought in North Africa".  Already in 1996, Minister Pasquini, President Chirac and Prime Minister Alain Juppé had requested that the existing "Title of the Nation's Gratitude" in the form of an official scroll already awarded to soldiers and civilians having served in North Africa between 1952 and 1962, finally be linked to the award of a specific medal.

Unfortunately, not all veterans awarded the "Title of the Nation's Gratitude" met the new medal's award prerequisites and almost immediately, new pressures were placed on the government for new medals or for a single one encompassing all bearers of the Title. It took five years for the new award to be established on 12 April 2002 by decree 2002-511.  The "Medal of the Nation's Gratitude" would finally satisfy all involved parties.

The North Africa medal ceased to be awarded that very day following barely five years of existence.  It was replaced by the Medal of the Nation's Gratitude with the clasp "AFRIQUE DU NORD".

Award statute
The North Africa medal was bestowed to French civilians and military personnel, as well as to foreign nationals serving in the ranks of the French Foreign Legion, who held the "Title of the Nation's Gratitude" for at least ninety days service in:
Algeria between 31 October 31, 1954 and 2 July 1962;
Morocco between 31 June 1953 and 1 March 1956;
Tunisia between 1 January 1952 and 19 March 1956.

The ninety-day period of service could be waived for personnel evacuated for treatment of wounds received during these operations.  Award of the medal granted the bearer the same rights as the "Title of the Nation's Gratitude", namely the right to a collective pension fund and to have the French flag draping one's coffin upon death.

None can wear this medal that has been condemned to a fixed prison term of one year or more for a crime he committed.

Award description
The North Africa medal was a 34mm in diameter gilded medal struck from bronze.  The obverse bore the relief image of an Agadez cross (Southern cross) surrounded by the inscription also in relief "RÉPUBLIQUE FRANÇAISE".  The reverse bore the relief inscription on two lines "MÉDAILLE" "D'AFRIQUE DU NORD" over the relief image of a sprig of three oak leaves.

The medal hung from a ribbon passing through a ring through the medal's ball shaped suspension loop.  The 34mm wide sand coloured silk moiré ribbon bore inverted 34mm wide and 3mm thick blue chevrons.  The undress ribbon bore three such chevrons.

Notable recipients (partial list)
General Pierre Vincent
General Denis Mercier
General Benoît Puga
General Bruno Dary
General Marcel Valentin
Captain Hubert Clément
Sergeant Gilles Mourey

See also

Scramble for Africa
French protectorate of Tunisia
French protectorate in Morocco
French Algeria
Algerian War

References

External links
Museum of the Legion of Honour (in French)
National Association of the bearers of the Title of the Nation's Gratitude (in French)

Awards established in 1997
French campaign medals
Awards disestablished in 2002
History of North Africa
French colonisation in Africa
Civil awards and decorations of France